Andrea Fabiano (born May 17, 1976 in Bari) is an Italian company executive. He is the Director of Rai 2 since October 12, 2017.

Biography 
He began his career at Rai in 1999 as a marketer. In 2015 he was appointed Deputy Director of Rai 1, and then became director in 2016, appointed by the director general of Rai Antonio Campo Dall'Orto. He is the youngest director in the history of Rai 1. He was then made Director in Rai 2.

References 

1976 births
Living people
Rai (broadcaster) people